Boggo Road Gaol in Brisbane, Australia, was Queensland’s main jail from the 1880s to the 1980s, by which time it had become notorious for poor conditions and rioting. Located on Annerley Road in Dutton Park, an inner southern suburb of Brisbane, it is the only surviving intact gaol in Queensland that reflects penological principles of the 19th century. After closing in 1992, the larger 1960s section was demolished, leaving the heritage listed section (built as a women’s prison in 1905), which is open to the public through guided tours run by Boggo Road Gaol Pty Ltd.

It was officially known as "Brisbane Gaol" but was commonly known as "Boggo Road" after the original name of the Annerley Road. A new street formed after 1996 now has the name Boggo Road.

History

In the 1850s, the district where the gaol was subsequently located was known unofficially as 'Boggo', and by the 1860s the track through the area was known as Boggo Road. 

It has been suggested that the name came about because the area was very boggy in wet weather. Another theory is that Boggo (or 'Bloggo' or 'Bolgo') was a corruption of an Aboriginal word meaning 'two leaning trees', and that the road was named after two prominent trees at either One-Mile Swamp or what is now Wilkins Street, off Annerley Road. Another possibility is that Boggo Road was an unofficial and unmaintained short-cut between Ipswich Road and Stanley Street that became very boggy after rain. Boggo Road was officially renamed Annerley Road in 1903, but the colloquial name for the gaol that had long been in use stayed.

In 1863, land off Boggo Road was set aside as a government reserve, finally proclaimed a gaol reserve in 1880. The first cellblock opened on 2 July 1883, built by Robert Porter, contained 57 cells, and was constructed using materials from the demolished Petrie Terrace Jail. In 1903, a new prison was built to hold female prisoners. This later became known as the No.2 Division, and is now the only section still standing, and is listed on the Queensland State Heritage Register. The 'No.1 Division' built in 1883 was the scene of 42 hangings, including the hanging of Ernest Austin in 1913—the last execution in Queensland. A new prison was built around the perimeter of No.1 prison during the 1960s and No.1 prison was demolished leaving area for an oval and recreational facilities for the newly built prison, which had running cold water and toilet facilities in all cells. Under the oval was the facility that became known as the "black hole" where prisoners were subjected to "punishment". The "black hole" continued in use until the late '80s. A new women’s gaol was also built at this time. The gaol was originally designed to cater for 40 male prisoners serving as a holding place for prisoners heading to St Helena Island in Moreton Bay. However, by 1989 there were 187 male prisoners and the women's facility had around 200 additional prisoners.

Protests at the gaol during the 1970s saw inmates undertake hunger strikes, roof-top protests, and rioting over the poor conditions and treatment. The prison was constantly in the headlines and became notorious around Australia. Cells in the No. 2 prison did not have any form of sanitation, and facilities for washing were lacking. Prisoners were required to use a bucket through the evening for toilet breaks and empty it, or 'slop out', in the morning. A Queensland Government inquiry into the living conditions of State prisons found Boggo Road to be outdated and inadequate for prisoners' needs. No. 2 Division was closed in 1989. No. 1 division was closed in 1992 and was demolished in 1996 (a small section of what was "C5" and guard tower still remain). The women’s prison operated until 2000 and was demolished in 2006.

Since 1992, the No. 2 Division was home to the Boggo Road Gaol Museum, which featured displays of prison-related artefacts. Throughout the 1990s, ex-officers conducted guided tours of the site, and from 2003 the museum and tours were operated by the Boggo Road Gaol Historical Society, a non-profit incorporated association of volunteers. Since December 2012, Boggo Road Gaol became a tourist attraction for Queensland, with guided tours being conducted by Boggo Road Gaol Pty, who are now officially licensed to run tours and events at the gaol. Like many other similar places around the country, the site also hosts guided ghost tours.

Redevelopment of the surrounding site began in 2006, leading to the temporary closure of the Boggo Road Gaol historical site. Since 2012 the gaol has been re-opened to the public. Boggo Road has since been turned into an urban village called Boggo Road Urban Village and was completed in 2010.

Heritage listing
The No. 2 Division and the remnants of No. 1 Division were listed on the Queensland Heritage Register in 1993.

Notable prisoners
 Hon. Gordon Browna former President of the Australian Senate
 James Finch and Andrew Stuartthe "Whiskey Au-Go-Go" murderers
 Nathan Jonesactor and professional wrestler
 Debbie Kilroy prisoner rights activist, founder of Sisters Inside
 Patrick Kenniffalso known as Queensland's last bushranger
 Michael PetersonAustralian surfing legend
 Wayne Michael Ryan convicted multiple bank robber who escaped Boggo Road Gaol twice (1988 and 1989)
 Ellen Thompson the only woman hanged in Queensland
 Arthur Ernest "Slim" Halliday murdered a taxi driver and was the only prisoner who managed to escape from the prison twice.

Executions
42 prisoners were hanged at the Gaol.

Popular culture

Boggo Road is mentioned in the Australian soap opera Prisoner as the prison where Joan Ferguson worked prior to coming to Melbourne. It was also visited in the season final of The Amazing Race Australia 2. Boggo Road is also the setting for the second episode of the sixth season of the American reality show The Mole.
Australian Shed Rock band, The Chats also reference a 1989 riot at Boggo Road in their song “Boggo Breakout” released in 2022

See also

 Boggo Road Busway
 List of Australian prisons

References

External links

Boggo Road Gaol Historical Society website
Boggo Road Prison (Steve Gage)
History of Boggo Road Gaol
Boggo Road Gaol Complex Discover Queensland Buildings website

Queensland Heritage Register
Defunct prisons in Queensland
Prison museums in Australia
1883 establishments in Australia
1989 disestablishments in Australia
Maximum security prisons in Australia
Museums in Brisbane
History of Brisbane
Dutton Park, Queensland